Villaharta is a city located in the province of Córdoba, Spain.

References

External links
Villaharta - Sistema de Información Multiterritorial de Andalucía

Municipalities in the Province of Córdoba (Spain)